"All of My Love" is a 1989 single by The Gap Band.  The single was their first release on the Capitol label and was the group's last single to make it to number one on the Hot Black singles chart.  "All of My Love" did not chart on the Hot 100.

Chart positions

References

1989 songs
1989 singles
The Gap Band songs
Capitol Records singles
New jack swing songs